Santa Luzia do Norte is a municipality located in the Brazilian state of Alagoas. Its population was 7,320 (2020) and its area is 29 km², which makes it the smallest municipality of Alagoas.

References

Municipalities in Alagoas